The Five Tibetan Rites is a system of exercises reported to be more than 2,500 years old which were first publicized by Peter Kelder in a 1939 publication titled The Eye of Revelation.

The Rites are said to be a form of Tibetan yoga similar to the yoga series that originated in India. However, the Five Rites and traditional Tibetan yoga both emphasize "a continuous sequence of movement" (Sanskrit: vinyasa), whereas Indian forms focus on "static positions". Although the Rites have circulated amongst yogis for decades, skeptics say that Tibetans have never recognized them as being authentic Tibetan practices.

The Five Tibetan Rites are also referred to as "The Five Rites", "The Five Tibetans" and "The Five Rites of Rejuvenation".

Publication

Although practically nothing is known about Kelder, one source reports that he was raised as an adopted child in the mid-western United States and left home while in his teens in search of adventure. In the 1930s, Kelder claims to have met, in southern California, a retired British army colonel who shared with him stories of travel and the subsequent discovery of the Rites.
Originally written as a 32-page booklet, the publication is the result of Kelder's conversations with the colonel.

Booklet

In his booklet, Kelder claims that while stationed in India, British army officer Colonel Bradford (a pseudonym) heard a story about a group of lamas who had apparently discovered a "Fountain of Youth". The "wandering natives", as he called them, told him of old men who inexplicably became healthy, strong, and full of "vigor and virility" after entering a particular lamasery. After retiring, Kelder's Colonel Bradford went on to discover the lamasery and lived with the lamas, where they taught him five exercises, which they called "rites". According to the booklet, the lamas describe seven spinning, "psychic vortexes" within the body: two of these are in the brain, one at the base of the throat, one on the right side of the body in the vicinity of the liver, one in the reproductive anatomy, and one in each knee. As we grow older, the spin rate of the "vortexes" diminishes, resulting in "ill-health". However, the spin rate of these "vortexes" can be restored by performing the Five Rites daily, resulting in improved health.

Bradford was also instructed in how to perform a sixth rite, which the lamas recommended only for those willing to "lead a more or less continent (celibate) life." Additionally, Bradford reveals information on the importance of what foods one should eat, proper food combinations, and the correct method of eating. In the 1946 updated version of The Eye of Revelation, Peter Kelder reveals that the mantra Om (Aum) has a very powerful stimulating effect on the pineal gland, if intoned correctly.

Disputed origins

Although the origin of the Five Rites before the publication of The Eye of Revelation is disputed between practitioners and skeptics, a comparison of illustrations of the postures shows a remarkable similarity between the Rites and authentic Tibetan 'phrul 'khor exercises from a system rendered into English as Vajra Body Magical Wheel Sun and Moon Union. It has been noted, however, that even though these comparisons are compelling, a closer examination reveals that these similarities are misleading. Chris Kilham, whose 1994 book The Five Tibetans helped respark the Rites' popularity, says, "As the story has it, they were shared by Tibetan lamas; beyond that I know nothing of their history." Even though the historic lineage of the Rites before the publication of Kelder's booklet remains to be ascertained, the Rites have nevertheless been affirmed by a lama and scholar of the Sa skya tradition of Tibetan Buddhism as being "a genuine form of yoga and were originally taken from an authentic Indo-Tibetan tantric lineage, namely a cycle of yantra-yoga associated with the Sadnadapadadharma." However, it has been argued that the Five Rites predate yoga as we know it today by as much as seven hundred years or more and, therefore, could not have derived from either Tibetan or Indian forms of yoga. Moreover, it has been suggested that the Rites are more likely to have originated from a system of Kum Nye which, like the Rites, date back 2,500 years. Nevertheless, Kilham states that "[t]he issue at hand, though, is not the lineage of the Five Tibetans. The point is their immense potential value for those who will clear 10 minutes a day to practice."

Performing the Rites

In the original The Eye of Revelation booklet, Kelder suggests standing erect between each of the Five Rites with hands on hips and taking one or two deep breaths; he neither implies nor suggests that specific breathing patterns should be adopted while performing the movements. Nevertheless, subsequent publications, particularly those of Five Tibetans Teacher and author, Carolinda Witt, contain edits which recommend and detail specific instructions for breathing while performing the exercises. Witt and other practitioners also recommend taking caution before performing the Rites due to the possibility of aggravating certain health conditions, or overstraining the body.

Kelder cautions that when performing the First Rite, spinning must always be performed in a clockwise direction. He also states that Bradford clearly recalled that the Maulawiyah, otherwise known as "Whirling Dervishes", always spun from left to right, in a clockwise direction. No mention is made of the orientation of the palms, although the original illustration of the Rite in the 1939 edition of The Eye of Revelation clearly depicts both palms as facing toward the ground. Here arises a point of contention: the Whirling Dervishes spin in the counter-clockwise direction, with the left palm facing down, towards the earth, and the right palm facing up, towards heaven. However, this discrepancy may find partial resolution in the fact that Tibetan Buddhist yoga regards clockwise rotation to be favorable, whereas counter-clockwise rotation is considered to be unfavorable.

First Rite

"Stand erect with arms outstretched, horizontal with the shoulders. Now spin around until you become slightly dizzy. There is only one caution: you must turn from left to right." If you get dizzy, slow down, or do fewer repetitions. You can also improve the smoothness of your technique, or try a few natural remedies.

Second Rite

"Lie full length on rug or bed. Place the hands flat down alongside of the hips. Fingers should be kept close together with the finger-tips of each hand turned slightly toward one another. Raise the feet until the legs are straight up. If possible, let the feet extend back a bit over the body toward the head, but do not let the knees bend. Hold this position for a moment or two and then slowly lower the feet to the floor, and for the next several moments allow all of the muscles in the entire body to relax completely. Then perform the Rite all over again."

"While the feet and legs are being raised it is a good idea also to raise the head, then while the feet and legs are being lowered to the floor lower the head at the same time."

Third Rite

"Kneel on a rug or mat with hands at sides, palms flat against the side of legs. Then lean forward as far as possible, bending at the waist, with head well forward—chin on chest. The second position of this Rite is to lean backward as far as possible. Cause the head to move still further backward. The toes will prevent you from falling over backward. The hands are always kept against the side of the legs. Next come to an erect (kneeling) position, relax as much as possible for a moment, and perform Rite all over again."

Fourth Rite

"Sit erect on rug or carpet with feet stretched out in front. The legs must be perfectly straight -- back of knees must be well down or close to the rug. Place the hands flat on the rug, fingers together, and the hands pointing outward slightly. Chin should be on chest -- head forward."

"Now gently raise the body, at the same time bend the knees so that the legs from the knees down are practically straight up and down. The arms, too, will also be vertical while the body from shoulders to knees will be horizontal. As the body is raised upward allow the head gently to fall backward so that the head hangs backward as far as possible when the body is fully horizontal. Hold this position for a few moments, return to first position, and RELAX for a few moments before performing the Rite again."

"When the body is pressed up to complete horizontal position, tense every muscle in the body."

Fifth Rite

"Place the hands on the floor about two feet apart. Then, with the legs stretched out to the rear with the feet also about two feet apart, push the body, and especially the hips, up as far as possible, rising on the toes and hands. At the same time the head should be brought so far down that the chin comes up against the chest. Next, allow the body to come slowly down to a ‘sagging’ position. Bring the head up, causing it to be drawn as far back as possible."

"The muscles should be tensed for a moment when the body is at the highest point, and again at the lowest point."

Sixth Rite

"It should be practiced only when you feel an excess of sexual energy..."
"Stand straight up and slowly let all of the air out of your lungs...bend over and put your hands on your knees...with the lungs empty, return to a straight up posture. Place your hands on your hips, and press down on them... As you do this, pull in the abdomen as much as possible, and at the same time raise the chest.
...
hold this position as long as you possibly can.
...
take air into your empty lungs, let the air flow in through the nose. When the lungs are full, exhale through the mouth.
As you exhale, relax your arms... Then take several deep breaths through the mouth or nose, allowing them to escape through either the mouth or nose."

Claimed benefits of performing the rites

According to Kelder, Bradford's stay in the lamasery transformed him from a stooped, old gentleman with a cane to a tall and straight young man in the prime of his life. Additionally, he reported that Bradford's hair had grown back, without a trace of gray. The revised publications of The Eye of Revelation titled Ancient Secret of the Fountain of Youth also contain numerous testimonials by practitioners of the Rites, claiming that they yield positive medical effects such as improved eyesight, memory, potency, hair growth, restoration of full color to completely gray hair, and anti-aging. However, claims as to the benefits of the Rites are often exaggerated, resulting in unrealistic expectations. The benefits most likely to be achieved are increased energy, stress reduction, and an enhanced sense of calm, clarity of thought, increased strength and flexibility, resulting in an overall improvement in health and well-being. Some beginners report various mild detox effects such as runny nose, mild headache, achy joints, metallic taste in the mouth and slight nausea, particularly if they build up repetitions of the movements too quickly.

References

Further reading

Carolinda Witt. The Illustrated Five Tibetan Rites. UnMind Pty Ltd (June 2016). 
Carolinda Witt. Ancient Anti-Aging Secrets of the Five Tibetan Rites. UnMind Pty Ltd (Jan 2014). 
Carolinda Witt. The 10-Minute Rejuvenation Plan: T5T - the Revolutionary Exercise Program That Restores Your Body And Mind. Three Rivers Press (April 3, 2007). 
Carolinda Witt. T5T: The Five Tibetan Exercise Rites. Penguin/Lantern Books (Sept 2005).
Weor, Samael Aun. The Tibetan Exercises for Rejuvenation: Gnosis and the Yantra Yoga for Long Life. Glorian Publishing (June 1, 2008).
Tarthang Tulku. Kum Nye Relaxation Part 1: Theory, Preparation, Massage. Dharma Publishing (1978). 
Tarthang Tulku. Kum Nye Relaxation Part 2: Movement Exercises. Dharma Publishing (1978).

External links
Additional Information on the Five Rites with Researched Articles by Carolinda Witt
How To Do The Five Tibetan Rites by Carolinda Witt 
Possible Detox Effects of The Five Tibetan Rites by Carolinda Witt
The Five Tibetan Rites Benefits -The Truth Versus the Claims by Carolinda Witt 
Breathing With T5T - The Five Tibetans by Carolinda Witt
Flash Mavi Animated 5 Tibetans Lesson
Tibetan Exercises by Samael Aun Weor
Discussion on theories identifying Peter Kelder with Lost Horizon author James Hilton

Physical exercise
Health and wellness books
Yoga series
Health in Tibet
Tibetan Buddhist meditation